Ryan Henry East (born 7 August 1998) is an English professional footballer who plays for League Two club Bradford City as a midfielder.

Career

Reading
On 1 July 2016, East signed his first professional contract with Reading, extending it on 6 July 2017. On 12 March 2019, East signed a new contract, until the summer of 2021, and made his first team debut for Reading, becoming the 50th graduate from the club's academy.

Swindon Town
On 7 August 2021, East signed for Swindon Town on a one-year contract following a trial. East was released at the end of this one-year deal following defeat in the play-offs.

Bradford City
On 27 May 2022, East joined Bradford City on an initial two-year deal.

Career statistics

References

External links
 
 Reading Profile

1998 births
Living people
English footballers
Association football midfielders
Reading F.C. players
Swindon Town F.C. players
Bradford City A.F.C. players
English Football League players